In fluid mechanics, the thin-film equation is a partial differential equation that approximately predicts the time evolution of the thickness  of a liquid film that lies on a surface. The equation is derived via lubrication theory which is based on the assumption that the length-scales in the surface directions are significantly larger than in the direction normal to the surface. This significantly simplifies the governing equations. However, lubrication theory, as the name suggests, is typically derived for flow between two solid surfaces, hence the liquid forms a lubricating layer. The thin-film equation holds when there is a single free surface. With two free surfaces, the flow must be treated as a viscous sheet.

Definition 

The basic form of a 2-dimensional thin film equation is

where the fluid flux  is

 ,

and μ is the viscosity (or dynamic viscosity) of the liquid, h(x,y,t) is  film thickness, γ is the interfacial tension between the liquid and the gas phase above it,  is the liquid density and  the surface shear. The surface shear could be caused by flow of the overlying gas or surface tension gradients. The vectors  represent the unit vector in the surface co-ordinate directions, the dot product serving to identify the gravity component in each direction. The vector  is the unit vector perpendicular to the surface.

A generalised thin film equation is discussed in 

  .

When  this may represent flow with slip at the solid surface whole  describes the thickness of a thin bridge between two masses of fluid in a Hele-Shaw cell. The value  represents surface tension driven flow.

A form frequently investigated with regard to the rupture of thin liquid films  involves  the addition of a disjoining pressure Π(h) in the equation, as in

 

where the function Π(h) is usually very small in value for moderate-large film thicknesses h and grows very rapidly when h goes very close to zero.

Properties 

Physical applications, properties and solution behaviour of the thin-film equation are reviewed in. With the inclusion of phase change at the substrate a form of thin film equation for an arbitrary surface is derived in. A detailed study of the steady-flow of a thin film near a moving contact line is given in. For a yield-stress fluid flow driven by gravity and surface tension is investigated in.

For purely surface tension driven flow it is easy to see that one static (time-independent) solution is a paraboloid of revolution

 

and this is consistent with the experimentally observed spherical cap shape of a static sessile drop, as a "flat" spherical cap that has small height can be accurately approximated in second order with a paraboloid. This, however, does not handle correctly the circumference of the droplet where the value of the function h(x,y) drops to zero and below, as a real physical liquid film can't have a negative thickness. This is one reason why the disjoining pressure term Π(h) is important in the theory.

One possible realistic form of the disjoining pressure term is

 

where B, h*, m and n are some parameters. These constants and the surface tension  can be approximately related to the equilibrium liquid-solid contact angle  through the equation

 .

The thin film equation can be used to simulate several behaviors of liquids, such as the fingering instability in gravity driven flow.

The lack of a second-order time derivative in the thin-film equation is a result of the assumption of small Reynold's number in its derivation, which allows the ignoring of inertial terms dependent on fluid density . This is somewhat similar to the situation with Washburn's equation, which describes the capillarity-driven flow of a liquid in a thin tube.

See also 

 Partial differential equation
 Lubrication theory
 Disjoining pressure

References

External links
 Viscous Thin Films - Max Planck Institute

Equations of fluid dynamics